Columbia River Highway may refer to:

Historic Columbia River Highway (No. 100), a scenic highway built from 1913 to 1922 through the Columbia River Gorge, Oregon, U.S.
Columbia River Highway No. 2, the highway from Portland to Washington via I-84 and US 730 that replaced the Historic Columbia River Highway in the gorge, Oregon, U.S.
Lower Columbia River Highway (No. 2W), route US 30 between Astoria and Portland, Oregon, U.S.

See also
Washington State Route 14, a highway on the north side of the Columbia River, Oregon, U.S.